The 1963 Los Angeles Rams season was the team's 26th year with the National Football League and the 18th season in Los Angeles. The Rams were attempting to improve on a disastrous 1–12–1 record in 1962, the worst in franchise history at the time. The Rams lost their first 5 games, including a 52–14 loss at home to the Chicago Bears, the worst home loss in franchise history at the time. The 52 points allowed in that game are the most ever surrendered by the Rams in a home game in franchise history. The Rams then split their next four games to stand at 2–7. Los Angeles then won three consecutive games to stand at 5–7 and keep their slim playoff hopes alive, but two final losses sealed their fate as they finished with a 5–9 record, missing the playoffs for the eighth consecutive season.

Offseason

NFL draft

Regular season

Schedule

Standings

References

Los Angeles Rams
Los Angeles Rams seasons
Los Angeles Rams